Many is a town in, and the parish seat of Sabine Parish in western Louisiana. The population was 2,853 at the 2010 census, a decrease of 36 or 1.246 percent from 2000.

History
The site where Many currently sits was originally a Belgian settlement believed to be founded in 1837.  The Town of Many was officially founded March 21, 1843, when the Louisiana Legislature passed Act 46. The act split Natchitoches Parish into several new parishes, including Sabine Parish. That Act declared that the seat of government for the newly created Sabine Parish, be named in honor of Colonel James B. Many, who commanded the garrison at the nearby Fort Jesup.

Geography
Many is located at  (31.567769, -93.477721).

Climate
Climate is characterized by relatively high temperatures and evenly distributed precipitation throughout the year.  According to the Köppen Climate Classification system, Many has a humid subtropical climate, abbreviated "Cfa" on climate maps.

<div style="width:73%;">

</div style>

Demographics

2020 census

As of the 2020 United States census, there were 2,571 people, 898 households, and 543 families residing in the town.

2010 census
As of the 2010 United States Census, there were 2,853 people living in the town. The racial makeup of the town was 48.1% Black, 44.3% White, 1.5% Native American, 0.7% Asian and 2.6% from two or more races. 2.8% were Hispanic or Latino of any race.

2000 census
The racial makeup of the town was 48.18% White, 47.42% African American, 1.70% Native American, 0.48% Asian, 0.03% Pacific Islander, 0.28% from other races, and 1.90% from two or more races. Hispanic or Latino of any race were 1.70% of the population.

There were 1,073 households, out of which 32.2% had children under the age of 18 living with them, 34.6% were married couples living together, 23.9% had a female householder with no husband present, and 38.3% were non-families. 34.8% of all households were made up of individuals, and 15.6% had someone living alone who was 65 years of age or older. The average household size was 2.41 and the average family size was 3.14.

In the town, the population was spread out, with 26.5% under the age of 18, 10.8% from 18 to 24, 23.7% from 25 to 44, 20.9% from 45 to 64, and 18.0% who were 65 years of age or older. The median age was 36 years. For every 100 females, there were 82.4 males. For every 100 females age 18 and over, there were 76.3 males.

The median income for a household in the town was $20,000, and the median income for a family was $24,329. Males had a median income of $28,500 versus $15,870 for females. The per capita income for the town was $12,153. About 28.4% of families and 35.5% of the population were below the poverty line, including 46.7% of those under age 18 and 26.3% of those age 65 or over.

Culture
 Hodges Gardens, Park and Wilderness Area

Education
Public schools in Sabine Parish are operated by the Sabine Parish School Board. The town of Many is zoned to Many Elementary School (Grades PK-3), Many Junior High School (Grades 4–8), and Many High School (Grades 9–12).

Many is also home to the Central Louisiana Technical College's Sabine Valley Campus. The campus offers technical education programs, general education courses, high school dual enrollment, adult basic education, and workforce development training.

Media

Newspaper 

 The Sabine Index

Radio 

All of the radio stations in Many are in the Natchitoches Market.

Notable people
Cliff Ammons, former Louisiana state representative and the "father of Toledo Bend Reservoir", was on the faculty of Many High School from 1948 to 1967.
Frank Cole, former football coach at Many High School who served in both houses of the Louisiana State Legislature between 1944 and 1960
 U.S. Representative Ed Gossett was born 1902 in a sawmill camp known as Yellow Pine, near Many.
Charlie Joiner, former National Football League wide receiver and member of the Pro Football Hall of Fame, was born in Many.
Frances (Poppy) Northcutt, the first female engineer to work in NASA's Mission Control during Apollo 8.
John S. Pickett, Jr., state representative 1968 to 1972, 11th Judicial District Court judge 1972 to 1990, school board member of Sabine Parish School Board
Benjamin Teekell, state representative from Red River Parish from 1920 to 1928, was living in Many in the 1930 United States Census
Ronald G. Tompkins, American physician and academic

Gallery

References

External links
 Sabine Parish
 Toledo Bend (Sabine Parish) Tourist Commission
 Sabine Parish School District

Towns in Sabine Parish, Louisiana
Towns in Louisiana
Parish seats in Louisiana
Populated places established in 1843
1843 establishments in Louisiana